Epilobium lanceolatum, the spear-leaved willowherb, is a species in the genus Epilobium, belonging to the Onagraceae or "evening primrose" family. It grows between 30 and 60 cm high. This perennial plant has lance-shaped leaves, steadily narrowing to both ends, with long petioles; 5-7mm, grey to green-blue, with widely toothed margins. The flowers are white fading to pink; blooming from June to August. Epilobium lanceolatum occurs across western Europe.

References

lanceolatum